Comeuppance may refer to:

Comeuppance (film), a 2000 Hong Kong film
Comeuppance (album), a 2002 album by Sphere 3
"Comeuppance", a 2014 episode of the TV series House of Lies
Comeuppance, a record label of Steve Harley
"Comeuppance", a song by The Most Serene Republic from the EP Fantasick Impossibliss